Ian Thomas McAllister (born 11 April 1969) is a Canadian wildlife conservationist, film director and nature photographer.  McAllister is a co-founder of Pacific Wild. He is the author and co-author of 15 books, and has directed many films.

Early life and education

McAllister was born in West Vancouver in 1969, one of five children of Peter and Jane McAllister. He attended Shawnigan Lake School, on Vancouver Island and took Southeast Asian studies at the University of Victoria.

Career

In 1991 Ian co-founded the organization Raincoast Conservation Society. After visiting the Great Bear Rainforest in about 1994, he began studying and photographing the area. In 1997 he published a book, The Great Bear Rainforest: Canada’s Forgotten Coast, with his wife Karen and Cameron Young; the next year he and his wife were named by Time magazine as an “Environmental leaders of the 21st Century”.

In 2007 the McAllisters founded the Canadian wildlife conservation organization Pacific Wild, which works to bring awareness to conservation issues in the Great Bear Rainforest through visual storytelling, education and engagement whilst advocating for wildlife and their habitat. 

In 2016 McAllister presented a talk, "Conservation in Canada's Great Bear Rainforest" at the TEDxBrentwoodCollegeSchool event.

McAllister's film Great Bear Rainforest: Land of the Spirit Bear, shot for IMAX and Giant Screen theatres, was released internationally in 2019.

Ian McAllister resigned as executive director of Pacific Wild on Aug. 16, 2021. The 'Narwhal' reports his statement of resignation as, “It’s time for me to step away for personal and professional reasons and for a new executive director to take the organization forward.”  

McAllister is a Fellow of the International League of Conservation Photographers and the Royal Canadian Geographical Society.

His images have been featured on the front cover of National Geographic Magazine and he is currently directing development of two new IMAX films. His images are represented by National Geographic Image Collection.

Awards

In 2000, McAllister received the Rainforest Action Network’s Rainforest Hero Award. In 2010 he was the recipient of the North American Nature Photography Association’s Vision Award.

In 2019, McAllister was given and award for Best Cinematography by the Giant Screen Cinema Association, as well as an award for Best Engaging Youth Film by Jackson Wild Media.

Publications
 The Great Bear Rainforest: Canada's Forgotten Coast, by Ian McAllister and Karen McAllister with Cameron Young. Harbour Publishing 1997
 The Last Wild Wolves: Ghosts of the Great Bear Rainforest, by Ian McAllister, with introduction by Paul C. Paquet and contributions from Chris Darimont. Greystone Books, Douglas & McIntyre Publishers, 2007
 The Salmon Bears: Giants of the Great Bear Rainforest, by Ian McAllister and Nicholas Read. Orca Book Publishers, 2010
 The Sea Wolves: Living Wild in the Great Bear Rainforest, by Ian McAllister and Nicholas Read. Orca Book Publishers, 2010
 Following the Last Wild Wolves, by Ian McAllister, with introduction by Paul Paquet and contributions from Chris Darimont. Douglas & McIntyre Publishers, 2011
 The Great Bear Sea: Exploring the Marine Life of a Pacific Paradise, by Ian McAllister and Nicholas Read. Orca Book Publishers, 2013
 Great Bear Wild: Dispatches from a Northern Rainforest, by Ian McAllister, introduction by Robert F. Kennedy Jr. Greystone Books, 2014
 The Wild in You: Voices from the Forest and the Sea. Poems by Lorna Crozier with images by Ian McAllister. Greystone Books, 2015
 Wolf Island, by Ian McAllister and Nicholas Read. Orca Book Publishers, March 2017
 A Bear’s Life, by Ian McAllister and Nicholas Read. Orca Book Publishers,
 The Seal Garden, by Ian McAllister and Nicholas Read. Orca Book Publishers, March 2018.
 A Whale’s World, Ian McAllister and Nicolas Read. Orca Book Publishers, August 2018.
 Great Bear Rainforest: A Giant Screen Adventure in the Land of the Spirit Bear, by Ian McAllister and Alex Van Tol. Orca Book Publishers, February 2019.
 Babies of the Great Bear Rainforest, by Ian McAllister. Orca Book Publishers, February 2019

References

External links
 Pacific Wild official website 
 
 Great Bear Books, Orca Book Publishers
 Profile at Greystone Books

See also

 Conservation biology
 Environmentalism
 Bear conservation

Living people
Canadian photographers
1969 births
Canadian businesspeople
Canadian male non-fiction writers
Non-fiction environmental writers
Canadian conservationists
20th-century Canadian non-fiction writers
21st-century Canadian non-fiction writers